Emilie Francati (born 24 June 1997) is a former tennis player from Denmark.

She reached a career-high combined junior ranking of 50 and the 2015 Australian Open girls' doubles semifinals. On the ITF Women's Circuit, she won one singles title and 11 doubles titles.

Playing for Denmark Fed Cup team, Francati has a win–loss record of 17–4.

ITF Circuit finals

Singles: 2 (1 title, 1 runner-up)

Doubles: 18 (11 titles, 7 runner-ups)

External links

 
 
 

1997 births
Living people
Danish people of Italian descent
Danish female tennis players
People from Gentofte Municipality
Sportspeople from the Capital Region of Denmark